Honorary Architect of Georgia is an award issued annually to the most distinguished architects in Georgia. The award is mentioned in the Constitution of Georgia, in the chapter On Engineering Matters (IV-11), while the administration of the selective procedures and awarding ceremonies is undertaken by the Ministry of Economic Development of Georgia.

2008 

Professor Giuli Gegelia
Guram Abuladze

2009 

Givi Beridze
Davit Abuladze
Duglas Zamtaradze
Vitali Frangishvili

References 

Architecture awards